Methona is a genus of clearwing (ithomiine) butterflies, named by Edward Doubleday in 1847. They are in the brush-footed butterfly family, Nymphalidae.

Species
Arranged alphabetically:
Methona confusa Butler, 1873
Methona curvifascia Weymer, 1883
Methona grandior (Forbes, 1944)
Methona maxima (Forbes, 1944)
Methona megisto C. & R. Felder, 1860
Methona singularis (Staudinger, [1884])
Methona themisto (Hübner, 1818)

References 

Ithomiini
Nymphalidae of South America
Nymphalidae genera